Non-X histiocytoses are a clinically well-defined group of cutaneous syndromes characterized by infiltrates of monocytes/macrophages, as opposed to X-type histiocytoses in which the infiltrates contain Langerhans cells.  Conditions included in this group are:

 Juvenile xanthogranuloma
 Benign cephalic histiocytosis
 Generalized eruptive histiocytoma
 Xanthoma disseminatum
 Progressive nodular histiocytosis
 Papular xanthoma
 Hereditary progressive mucinous histiocytosis
 Reticulohistiocytosis
 Indeterminate cell histiocytosis
 Sea-blue histiocytosis
 Erdheim–Chester disease

See also 
 X-type histiocytosis
 Histiocytosis

References 

Monocyte- and macrophage-related cutaneous conditions
Histiocytosis